Dersca is a commune in Botoșani County, Western Moldavia, Romania. It is composed of a single village, Dersca. It also included Lozna and Străteni villages until 2003, when they were split off to form Lozna Commune.

References

Dersca
Localities in Western Moldavia